Sam Crean is an English professional rugby union player, who currently plays as a prop forward for Premiership Rugby side Saracens.

Early life 
Crean was born in Medway, Kent and grew up in Rochester. He played his junior rugby at Medway RFC, starting from the age of five and playing through to the U16s side, and also represented the Kent county rugby team at U15s and 16s level. He then secured a scholarship to attend Harrow School, after being spotted at a rugby festival by Saracens academy coach Rory Teague. His peers at the school included fellow future Saracens academy graduates Andy Christie, Elliott Obatoyinbo, Sean Reffell and Manu Vunipola.

Rugby career 
Crean joined the Saracens junior academy in 2015 and then graduated up to the senior academy in 2018, when he spent time out on loan at Bishop's Stortford for the 2018–19 National League 1 season. He initially played as a hooker, before transitioning into the role of loosehead prop. He was also involved in the Saracens Storm squad that won the Premiership Rugby Shield that season, including the 55–14 final victory over Newcastle Falcons A in 2019. His first-team debut arrived in the following season, making several appearances in the Premiership and Premiership Rugby Cup, as well as a single Champions Cup fixture against Racing 92.

Over the next two years, Crean was dual-registered with both Saracens and Ampthill, with the majority of his matches played for the latter club in the RFU Championship. Subsequently, he was promoted into the Saracens first-team squad on a full-time basis, ahead of the beginning of the 2022–23 season.

Crean has represented England at age-group level. He played two games for the England U20s during the abridged 2020 Six Nations, scoring one try.

References 

2000 births
Living people
English rugby union players
Rugby union props
Saracens F.C. players